Catapodium rigidum, ferngrass, is a species of annual grass in the family Poaceae (true grasses), distributed around the Mediterranean and the Middle East. It has been widely introduced throughout drier parts of the world, including parts of North America, South America, South Africa, Korea, Australia, and New Zealand. Individuals can reach .

Subtaxa
The following subtaxa are accepted:
Catapodium rigidum subsp. hemipoa  - more narrowly distributed from Macaronesia and the Mediterranean to Iran
Catapodium rigidum var. majus  - Middle East
Catapodium rigidum subsp. rigidum – entire range, including introductions

References

rigidum
Flora of Macaronesia
Flora of North Africa
Flora of Ireland
Flora of Great Britain
Flora of Southwestern Europe
Flora of Belgium
Flora of the Netherlands
Flora of Germany
Flora of Switzerland
Flora of the Crimean Peninsula
Flora of the Caucasus
Flora of Western Asia
Flora of the Arabian Peninsula
Flora of Djibouti